This is a list of electoral district results for the 1932 Queensland state election.

At the time, the voting system in Queensland was based on contingency voting, which was similar to the modern optional preferential voting system. In electorates with 3 or more candidates, preferences were not distributed if a candidate received more than 50% of the primary vote.

If none received more than 50%, all except the top two candidates were eliminated from the count and their preferences distributed between the two leaders, with the one receiving the most votes declared the winner.

Results by electoral district

Albert

Aubigny

Barcoo

Bowen

Bremer

Brisbane 

 Preferences were not distributed.

Bulimba 

 Preferences were not distributed.

Bundaberg

Buranda

Cairns

Carnarvon

Carpentaria

Charters Towers

Cook

Cooroora

Cunningham

Dalby

East Toowoomba

By-election 

 This by-election was caused by the death of Robert Roberts. It was held on 18 August 1934.

Enoggera

Fassifern

Fitzroy

Fortitude Valley

By-election 

 This by-election was caused by the death of Thomas Wilson. It was held on 15 July 1933.

Gregory

Gympie

Hamilton 

 Preferences were not distributed.

Herbert

Ipswich

Isis 

 Preferences were not distributed.

Ithaca

Kelvin Grove 

 Preferences were not distributed.

Kennedy

Keppel

Kurilpa

Logan 

 Preferences were not distributed.

Mackay 

 Preferences were not distributed.

Maranoa 

 Preferences were not distributed.

Maree 

 Preferences were not distributed.

Maryborough 

 Preferences were not distributed.

Merthyr 

 Preferences were not distributed.

Mirani

Mundingburra

Murilla

Murrumba 

 Preferences were not distributed.

Nanango

Normanby

Nundah

Oxley

Port Curtis

Rockhampton 

 Preferences were not distributed.

Sandgate 

 Preferences were not distributed.

South Brisbane

Stanley

By-election 

 This by-election was caused by the death of Ernest Grimstone. It was held on 9 December 1933.

The Tableland

Toowong 

 Preferences were not distributed.

Toowoomba 

 Preferences were not distributed.

Townsville 

 Preferences were not distributed.

Warrego 

 Preferences were not distributed.

Warwick 

 Preferences were not distributed.

West Moreton 

 Preferences were not distributed.

Wide Bay

Windsor

Wynnum

By-election 

 This by-election was caused by the death of Walter Barnes. It was held on 29 April 1933.

See also 

 1932 Queensland state election
 Candidates of the Queensland state election, 1932
 Members of the Queensland Legislative Assembly, 1932-1935

References 

Results of Queensland elections